Notaro is a surname. Notable people with the surname include:

 Chef Tony (born 1954), advertising pitchman; real name Anthony Notaro
 Laurie Notaro, novelist
 Mario Notaro (born 1950), football manager
 Peter J. Notaro (1935–2014), jurist
 Peter Notaro (born 1956), soccer forward
 Tig Notaro (born 1971), comedian

See also
 Branislav Notaros, American engineer

Italian-language surnames